The Miyakoan language ( Myākufutsu/Myākufutsї  or  Sumafutsu/Sїmafutsї) is a diverse dialect cluster spoken in the Miyako Islands, located southwest of Okinawa. The combined population of the islands is about 52,000 (as of 2011). Miyakoan is a Southern Ryukyuan language, most closely related to Yaeyama. Miyakoan is notable among the Japonic languages in that it allows non-nasal syllable-final consonants, something not found in most Japonic languages.

Variants
The most divergent variant is that of Tarama Island, the farthest island away. The other variants cluster as Ikema–Irabu and Central Miyako. Given the low degree of mutual intelligibility, Tarama language is sometimes considered a distinct language in its own right.

An illustrative lexeme is the name of the plant Alocasia (evidently an Austronesian loan: Tagalog ). This varies as Central Miyako (Hirara, Ōgami) , Ikema , Irabu (Nagahama) , Tarama .

Phonology
The description here is mostly based on the Ōgami variant, the Central Miyakoan variant of the smallest of the Miyako islands, from Pellard (2009). There is additional description based on the Irabu variant, the Ikema-Irabu variant of the second largest of the Irabu islands. 

Central Miyakoan variants do not have pitch accent; therefore, they are of ikkei type. Tarama distinguishes accent on the phonological word (stem plus clitics), e.g.

Vowels
There are five vowels in Ōgami.

 is truly unrounded, unlike the compressed Japanese u.

Numerous vowel sequences occur, and long vowels are treated as sequences of identical vowels, keeping the inventory at five.

 *pito > pstu 'person', *kimo > ksmu 'liver', *tabi > tabz 'journey' in Shimazato variant.

Sequences of phonetic consonants have been analyzed by Pellard (2009) as being phonemically consonantal as well.

In Irabu there are five main vowels and two rare mid vowels that occur in loanwords and some clitics.

Consonants
In Ōgami there are nine consonants, without a voicing contrast. (Most Miyakoan variants do distinguish voicing.)

The plosives tend to be somewhat aspirated initially and voiced medially. There are maybe a dozen words with optionally voiced initial consonants, such as babe ~ pape (a sp. of fish) and gakspstu ~ kakspstu 'glutton', but Pellard suggests they may be loans (babe is found in other variants, and gaks- is a Chinese loan; only a single word gama ~ kama 'grotto, cave' is not an apparent loan).

 may be spirantized before : kaina 'arm' , a꞊ka 'I (nominative)' .

When final  geminates, it becomes ; compare tin  'silver' with tinnu  'silver (accusative)'. , on the other hand, does not assimilate and appears finally unchanged, as in mku 'right', mta 'earth', and im 'sea'.

 is labiodental, not bilabial, and  palatalizes to  before the front vowels : pssi  'cold'.

 is clearly labiodental as well and tends to become a fricative  when emphasized or when geminated, as in  'calf'. It can be syllabic, as can all sonorants in Ōgami: vv  'to sell'. Final  contrasts with the high back vowels:  'snake',  'stick',  'fly' are accusative  with the clitic -u.

Phonotactics

Various sequences of consonants occur (mna 'shell', sta 'under', fta 'lid'), and long consonants are bimoraic (sta  fta , pstu ), so they are analyzed as consonant sequences as well. These can be typologically unusual:

 (sp. small fruit)
 'now'
 'you'
 'baby'
 'grass'
 'comb.' (from ff 'comb')
 'vegetable'
 'white'
 'dust.' (from ss 'dust')
 'mother'
 'potato.' (from mm 'potato')
 'day'

Geminate plosives do not occur, apart from a single morpheme, the quotative particle tta.

There are a few words with no voiced sounds at all (compare Nuxálk language § Syllables):

ss 'dust, a nest, to rub'
kss 'breast/milk, hook / to fish, to come'
pss 'day, vulva'
ff 'a comb, to bite, to rain, to close'
kff 'to make'
fks 'to build'
ksks 'month, to listen, to arrive', etc.
sks 'to cut'
psks 'to pull'

The contrast between a voiceless syllable and a voiced vowel between voiceless consonants can be seen in kff puskam  'I want to make (it)', ff꞊nkɑi  'to꞊the.comb', and paks꞊nu꞊tu  'bee꞊' (with a devoiced nasal after s). There is a contrast between ff꞊mɑi 'comb꞊' and ffu꞊mɑi 'shit꞊'. With tongue twisters, speakers do not insert schwas or other voiced sounds to aid in pronunciation:

kff ff 'the comb that I make'
kff ss 'the nest that I make'
kff kss 'the hook that I make'

The minimal word is either VV, VC, or CC (consisting of a single geminate), as in aa 'millet', ui 'over', is 'rock', ff 'comb'. There are no V or CV words; however, CCV and CVV words are found, as shown above.

Syllabification is difficult to analyze, especially in words such as usnkai (us-nkai) 'cow-' and saiafn (saiaf-n) 'carpenter-'.

There are 15-16 consonants in Irabu, which do have a voicing contrast.

 The sequences /sj, cj/ are pronounced as [ʃ, tʃ].
 Sequences /rr, žž/ are heard as [ɭː, z̞z].
 /n/ is pronounced as a velar nasal [ŋ] when preceding /k/.
 /ʋ/ is heard as [v] within consonant clusters.
 /n/ can be heard as [ɲ] when preceding /i/ or /j/.
 /ž/ is mostly phonetically pronounced as a less-fricated [z̞].
 /ɾ/ in word-final position is heard as [ɭ].
 /z̞/ is heard as voiceless [s̞] when occurring after a voiceless consonant.
 Palatalization [ʲ] occurs when consonants are preceding a palatal glide /j/ or a high-front /i/ (i.e. /mj, kj/; [mʲ, kʲ])
 Syllabic nasal sounds [m̩, n̩, (ŋ̩)], are heard in word-initial position when preceding consonants.

Orthography

References

External links
 Miyako dialect dictionary, Okinawa Center of Language Study
 Aleksandra Jarosz, Nikolay Nevskiy's Miyakoan dictionary (PhD dissertation on Nikolai Nevsky's draft manuscript dictionary of Miyakoan)
 The Digital Museum Project for the documentation of the culture and language of Nishihara, Miyakojima
 
 Videos of Isamu Shimoji, a Miyako musician
 
 
 

Ryukyuan languages
Miyako Islands